Elachista nielsencommelinae is a moth of the family Elachistidae. It is found along the northern coast and in the subcoastal areas of the Northern Territory.

The forewings are black with a bronzy sheen. The hindwings are dark grey.

The larvae feed on Commelina species. They mine the leaves of their host plant.

References

Moths described in 2011
Endemic fauna of Australia
nielsencommelinae
Moths of Australia
Taxa named by Lauri Kaila